The Musée du Fumeur (Smoking Museum) is a private museum of smoking located in the 11th arrondissement of Paris at 7 rue Pache, Paris, France. It is open daily except Monday; an admission fee is charged. The nearest métro station is Voltaire.

The museum is located within a  storefront, and contains a collection of smoking objects including European pipes, 17th century clay pipes, Native American ceremonial pipes, hookahs, Chinese opium pipes, Egyptian sheeshas, and snuffboxes, as well as cigars, tobacco samples, hemp-fiber clothing, and etchings, portraits, photographs, videos, and scientific drawings of tobacco plants.

See also 
 Musée-Galerie de la Seita
 List of museums in Paris

References 
 Musée du Fumeur
 Departures: Paris smoking museum honors what city will ban, Rolf Potts, Sunday, November 4, 2007

Fumeur, Musee
Buildings and structures in the 11th arrondissement of Paris
Smoking